Jean-Baptiste Benoy (13 August 1926 – 20 June 1980) was a Belgian wrestler. He competed in two events at the 1948 Summer Olympics.

References

1926 births
1980 deaths
Belgian male sport wrestlers
Olympic wrestlers of Belgium
Wrestlers at the 1948 Summer Olympics
Place of birth missing